English pop girl group the Spice Girls have starred in one feature film, as well as several television specials, documentaries and commercials. They made their film debut in 1997, starring in their feature film Spice World. The film was a commercial success, but was widely panned by critics, earning the group the Golden Raspberry Award for Worst Actress.

The Spice Girls have hosted various television specials. In November 1997, the Spice Girls became the first pop group to host ITV's An Audience with...; their show featured an all-female audience and was watched by 11.8 million viewers in the UK, one fifth of the country's total population. On Christmas Eve that year, the group presented a Spice Girls on Top of the Pops television special on BBC One. Concert specials of their three tours in the late 1990s were also broadcast. On Christmas Day 1997, ITV aired a concert special titled Spice Up Your Christmas, which consisted of highlights from the Spice Girls' October 1997 concert in Istanbul. The Spice Girls In Concert - Wild! pay-per-view concert special of the group's October 1997 show in Istanbul aired on various dates throughout 1998 in the US on Showtime. Its first airing on 17 January 1998 was the highest-rated music pay-per-view in seven years. The concert was aired again in the US on Fox Family Channel on 16 August 1998, receiving a 1.8 household rating despite being up against a four-hour Spice Girls MTV special and a different pay-per-view Spice Girls concert airing the same weekend. In September 1998, a television special titled Spice Girls: Live in Your Living Room was aired on Sky One. In it, Dani Behr and Georgie Stait presented live coverage of the Spice Girls' concert at Wembley Stadium, including a live fan call-in segment, interview footage with the group, and in-studio guests, followed by a live broadcast of the full concert. In 1999, a television special of the group's concert at Earl's Court titled Spice Girls: The Live One was broadcast in various countries and also included a documentary containing rehearsals and interviews with the Spice Girls.

The Spice Girls have released at least seven official behind-the-scenes television documentaries, including two tour documentaries and two making-of documentaries for their film Spice World. December 1997 was the release of their first official US television documentary Too Much Is Never Enough on UPN. The documentary focused on their reaction to their sudden rise to fame around the world, and was watched by 5.4 million viewers. In December 2007, the official documentary, Spice Girls: Giving You Everything, made its world premiere in Australia on FOX8. It aired on CTV in Canada on 19 December 2007, and on BBC One in the United Kingdom on 31 December 2007. The documentary attracted 3.5 million viewers in the UK, coming in second in its timeslot. In December 2012, the official documentary The Spice Girls' Story: Viva Forever! was aired on ITV to promote the group's West End musical "Viva Forever". The Spice Girls have also been the subject of a number of unofficial documentaries. In March 2001, ITV aired an unauthorised documentary about the Spice Girls titled Raw Spice. The film, which focused on the group before they became famous and featured never before seen footage of them from 1994, was the subject of four-year-long legal disputes with former members of the film's production company and the Spice Girls themselves, who tried to prevent it from being screened. The documentary was the most-watched program of the night that it aired, drawing 9.4 million viewers—almost 40% of the available audience. The Spice Girls have had episodes dedicated to them in several music biography series, including VH1's Behind the Music, E! True Hollywood Story, and MTV's BioRhythm.

The Spice Girls have appeared and performed in numerous television shows and events. In February 1997, the Spice Girls opened the 1997 Brit Awards with Geri Halliwell wearing the iconic Union Jack dress whilst performing onstage with the group. Their performance won Most Memorable Performance Of 30 Years at the 2010 Brit Awards. The band performed again at the 2000 Brit Awards, where they were presented with the Lifetime Achievement Award by Will Smith. Other notable appearances include Saturday Night Live (SNL), The Oprah Winfrey Show and two Royal Variety Performances. In June 1998, the group also performed their songs "Stop" and "Viva Forever" live with Luciano Pavarotti at his Pavarotti & Friends for the Children of Liberia benefit concert in Italy. The Spice Girls performed at the 2000 MTV Europe Music Awards; it was the group's last performance before their split in December that year, until their 2007 reunion. The first public performance by the Spice Girls during their 2007 reunion was made at the Kodak Theatre in Hollywood, where the group performed at the Victoria's Secret Fashion Show. They performed two songs, 1998 single "Stop" and the lead single from their greatest hits album, "Headlines (Friendship Never Ends)". The show was broadcast in December 2007, and was watched by 7.4 million viewers on CBS and 2.94 million viewers on The CW. In August 2012, after much speculation and anticipation from the press and the public, the group performed a medley of "Wannabe" and "Spice Up Your Life" at the 2012 Summer Olympics closing ceremony, reuniting solely for the event. Their performance became the most tweeted moment of the entire Olympics with over 116,000 tweets on Twitter per minute.

The Spice Girls have also starred in television commercials as part of their endorsement deals with several brands. In 1997 and 1998, they starred in commercials for Pepsi, Polaroid, Walkers Crisps, Impulse and Aprilia. For their 2007 reunion, the group starred in two commercials for British supermarket chain Tesco during the Christmas season. One of their Tesco commercials ranked number four in the "Top 10 ads with the highest recall of 2008" in Marketing Week's annual Adwatch rankings.

In 2019, Paramount Animation announced plans to release an animated Spice Girls film that would feature both new and classic music. The film is currently in development and is scheduled for a 2020 release. Simon Fuller is set to produce the film, with Karen McCullah and Kiwi Smith writing the screenplay. A director has not yet been announced.

Feature films

Television

Specials

Interviews/performances
This list is selective; the Spice Girls have appeared, performed and been interviewed in numerous television shows worldwide. For a more complete list, see their filmographies on IMDB and BFI.

Commercials

References

External links

Spice Girls at the British Film Institute

Filmography
Spice Girls